Gašić is a Serbian surname, a patronymic derived from Gaša or Gašo, diminutives of Gavrilo. It may refer to:

Danijel Gašić (born 1987), Serbian footballer
Srđan Gašić (born 1975), retired Serbian footballer
Milan Gašić (born 1993), Serbian footballer
Velimir Gašić (born 1964), Serbian basketball coach
Bratislav Gašić (born 1967), Serbian politician and former Defence Minister
Miroslav Gašić (born 1932), Serbian academic

See also
Gašević
Gašović

Serbian surnames